This article contains a list of awards and accolades won by and awarded to Quincy Jones.

Citations and honors
In July 1969, Jones's arrangement of "Fly Me to the Moon" recorded by Frank Sinatra and the Count Basie Orchestra was the first music played on NASA's first lunar landing mission by astronaut Buzz Aldrin.

In 1989, Quincy Jones was presented with the Sammy Cahn Lifetime Achievement Award from the Songwriters Hall of Fame.

In May 1990, Quincy Jones received an honorary degree from Seattle University, where he once attended classes.

In 2000, Harvard University endowed the Quincy Jones Professorship of Afro-American Music with a grant of $3 million from Time Warner. The endowed chair for African-American music, housed in Harvard's African and African-American Studies Department, is believed to be the first in the nation, and is presently held by the ethnomusicologist Ingrid Monson. Distinguished scholar and public intellectual Henry Louis Gates, Jr. is a close, personal friend of Jones.

In January 2005, Jones was honored by the United Negro College Fund at their annual Evening of Stars event for an entertainment career that has spanned over five decades.

Berklee College of Music considers Jones its most successful alumnus, even though he only attended for a year. His original application for admission is housed in a display case at the school. In 1983, Jones received an honorary doctorate of music from the college. On September 19, 2005, Jones was honored at the Dance Music Hall of Fame ceremony, when he was inducted for his many outstanding achievements as a producer. He was awarded the Polar Music Prize in 1994.

In 2005, Quincy Jones received an honorary Doctorate of Music from the University of Pennsylvania.

In 2006, Quincy Jones was nominated for the Tony award for best musical as a producer of The Color Purple.

On May 20, 2007, Jones received an honorary doctorate of humanities degree from Morehouse College in Atlanta, Georgia.

On March 26, 2001, Quincy Jones was made Commandeur (Commander) of the Légion d'Honneur for his significant achievements in his career.

In 2007, Jones was honored by the Harvard School of Public Health as its Mentor of the Year at a star-studded gala in New York City. The gala also marked the launch of Harvard's "Q Prize", an international award named for Jones which honors extraordinary advocacy on behalf of the world's children. "Quincy Jones's entire life is a testament to the power of mentoring," Dr. Jay Winsten,  an associate dean of the Harvard School of Public Health, said at the event. "He has served as a role model for using the power of celebrity to improve the lot of humankind."

Jones was presented with the annual George and Ira Gershwin Award for Lifetime Musical Achievement in 2007 during UCLA Spring Sing.

Princeton University also awarded an honorary doctorate degree to Quincy Jones, "an inspirational creative artist and entertainment industry executive," during Commencement exercises on June 3, 2008 for his contributions to music and entertainment.

On May 14, 2008, Washington University in St. Louis presented Jones with an honorary Doctorate of Arts degree, citing his lifetime musical accomplishments.

On June 14, 2008, Jones was awarded an honorary degree from the University of Washington and delivered the keynote at the university's 133rd commencement.

On June 24, 2008, at the BET Awards, Quincy Jones was presented with the Humanitarian Award.

On September 26, 2008, Garfield High School's Quincy Jones Performing Arts Center was officially dedicated to Quincy Jones.

On October 1, 2008, Jones was presented with the Unity Through Music Award at Thank Q: A World Music Tribute to the Humanitarian Works of Quincy Jones.

On December 15, 2008, Jones was inducted in the California Hall of Fame at The California Museum in Sacramento, California.

On July 3, 2009, Jones was made a Fellow of the Royal Welsh College of Music and Drama at an award ceremony in Cardiff, citing his lifetime musical accomplishments and Welsh family roots.

On September 24, 2009, Jones was honored with a Clinton Global Citizen award for Leadership in Philanthropy at the 2009 Clinton Global Initiative's annual meeting.

In December 2009, Jones was honored by Swiss-watch manufacturer Audemars Piguet with a limited edition watch with a case back engraved with Quincy Jones' signature, and reading "Millenary Quincy Jones – Limited Edition" as a reminder of its exclusivity.  Only 500 pieces of the watch were produced.

On May 8, 2010, Jones was presented with an honorary Doctorate of Music from the Jacobs School of Music at Indiana University. Jones was the commencement speaker for the undergraduate ceremonies.

In 2013, Jones was inducted into the Rock and Roll Hall of Fame.

In October 2014, Jones was made Commandeur de l'Ordre des Arts et des Lettres from the Minister of Culture in France. The ceremony was held at Arab World Institute and Jones was decorated by former Minister of Culture Jack Lang. Quincy Jones is the first musician made both Commandeur de l' Ordre des Arts et des Lettres and Commandeur de la Légion d'Honneur.

In 2015, Jones was the recipient of the Desi Arnaz Pioneer Award by the Latin Songwriters Hall of Fame.

In May 2021, Jones was one of 10 new members elected to the Royal Swedish Academy of Music, alongside Marika Field, Katarina Karnéus, Jonas Knutsson, Sten Sandell, Đuro Živković, Keiko Abe, Giancarlo Andretta, Stefan Dohr, and Richard Sparks.

In 2021, Jones was inducted into the Black Music & Entertainment Walk of Fame, as a "foundational inductee".

Awards and nominations

Emmy Awards

Grammy Awards
Quincy Jones has 80 Grammy nominations and won 28 Grammy Awards, the most Grammys for a living person, and second overall. The list below is incomplete.

Special Grammy Awards

Academy Awards

Special Academy Awards

Tony Awards

References

Jones, Quincy